KAT-7 is a radio telescope situated in the Meerkat National Park, in the Northern Cape of South Africa. Part of the Karoo Array Telescope project, it is the precursor engineering test bed to the larger MeerKAT telescope, but it has become a science instrument in its own right. The construction was completed in 2011 and commissioned in 2012. It also served as a technology demonstrator for South Africa's bid to host the Square Kilometre Array. KAT-7 is the first Radio telescope to be built with a composite reflector and uses a stirling pump for 75 K cryogenic cooling. The telescope was built to test various system for the MeerKAT array, from the ROACH correlators designed and manufactured in Cape Town, now used by various telescopes internationally, to composite construction techniques.

Technical specifications 
KAT-7 consist of 7 dishes of 12 metres in diameter, each a prime focus reflecting telescope.

Performance
In April 2010 four of the seven dishes were linked together as an integrated system to produce its first interferometric image of an astronomical object. In Dec 2010, there was a successful detection of very long baseline interferometry (VLBI) fringes between the Hartebeesthoek Radio Astronomy Observatory's 26 m dish and one of the KAT-7 dishes.

See also 

 Australian Square Kilometre Array Pathfinder
 Hartebeesthoek Radio Astronomy Observatory
 List of radio telescopes
 South African Astronomical Observatory for optical astronomy in South Africa
 Precision Array for Probing the Epoch of Reionization

References

External links 

 SKA South Africa
 eXperimental Development Model (XDM) at Hartebeeshoek

Astronomical observatories in South Africa
Buildings and structures in the Northern Cape
Karoo
Astronomy protected areas of South Africa
Square Kilometre Array